The 1970 Los Angeles Rams season was the team's 33rd year with the National Football League and the 25th season in Los Angeles. The team looked to improve on its 11-3 record from 1969. However, the Rams missed their mark by two games, and finished with a respectable 9-4-1 record. Despite the winning record, the team missed the playoffs for the 2nd time in 3 seasons.

Draft

Roster

Regular season
With the completion of the AFL–NFL merger, the league was realigned into 2 conferences with 3 divisions each.  The Rams were placed in the NFC Western Division with the Atlanta Falcons, New Orleans Saints, and San Francisco 49ers, none of whom had a winning record for any of the prior two seasons. The Rams, 49ers and Falcons were members of the Coastal Division of the Western Conference from 1967–69, while the Saints came from the Eastern Conference, where they were in the Capitol Division in 1967 and '69 and the Century Division in 1968. Gone from the Rams' division were the Baltimore Colts, with whom the Rams battled for a division title for the past 3 seasons, shifted to the AFC East. Consequently, the Rams were heavy favorites to win what was considered the weakest of the new divisions.

As it turned out, the prognosticators did not anticipate that 49er quarterback John Brodie would have an MVP season, that the 49ers had acquired some skilled young players, and the Rams veteran roster began to show signs of aging and suffered a number of injuries. Thus, instead of battling the Colts, the Rams would stage a season long battle for the NFC West with their California archrivals.

The Rams started the season as expected, with easy wins vs. the St. Louis Cardinals 34-13, at the Buffalo Bills 19-0, and against the San Diego Chargers 37-10. The 49ers came to L.A. in week 4 with a 2-1 record, having lost at Atlanta the week before, 21-20. The Rams were prohibitive favorites, but the 49ers forced 4 turnovers and had 3 sacks to win 20-6 and gain a share of the division lead. The Rams regained the division lead the very next week with a 31-21 win in Green Bay, while the 49ers tied the Saints at San Francisco. The 49ers then won 4 games in a row, while the Rams struggled to find consistency. They lost in the mud and rain on a Monday night in Minnesota to the powerful Vikings 13-3, beat the Saints in New Orleans 30-17, needed a last second touchdown to tie the Falcons in L.A. 10-10,  had 4 turnovers in an upset loss at home to the New York Jets (playing without an injured Joe Namath), then beat the Falcons in Atlanta 17-7, gaining ground after that win when the 49ers lost to the Lions in Detroit.

Week 11 was a showdown in San Francisco between the 7-2-1 49ers and the 6-3-1 Rams.  The Rams played perhaps their best game of the season in winning 30-13, and were now tied with the 49ers for 1st place with three games to play. More importantly, the Rams held the tiebreaker over San Francisco due to having a better division record (4-1-1 to 3-2-1).  After beating the Saints 34-16 in week 10, the 8-3-1 Rams faced the 8-4 Detroit Lions on a Monday night game in Los Angeles. The Lions won what would prove to be a pivotal game by the score of 28-23, dropping the Rams 1 game behind the 49ers and 1/2 game behind the Lions for the wild card spot.  The Rams crushed the New York Giants 31-3 in New York (costing the Giants both the NFC East title and the wild card spot), then awaited the result of the 49ers and Lions games. The Lions won easily at home vs. Green Bay 20-0, and the 49ers crushed the Oakland Raiders, 38-7 (the homestanding Raiders, having already won their division and guaranteed to host their first playoff game, rested most of their regulars).

Schedule

Game summaries

Week 1: vs. St. Louis Cardinals

Source: Pro-Football-Reference.com

Week 2: at Buffalo Bills

Source: Pro-Football-Reference.com

Week 14

Standings

References

Los Angeles Rams
Los Angeles Rams seasons
Los Angeles Rams